Richard Marsh is an auto racing driver from Derbyshire, England. After competing in the Ford Fiesta championship and the Porsche Carrera Cup he graduated to the production class of the British Touring Car Championship midway through the 2003 season with John Batchelor's Team Varta squad. He remained with the team for 2004 in the Touring Class, initially driving a Honda Civic Type-R but subsequently a Peugeot 307. For 2006 he rejoined the BTCC at its halfway point again driving a Peugeot 307 entered by Team Griffin Motorsport with sponsorship from Farécla. He did not score any points in his first race back, and the team missed several races due to unreliable machinery. For the final round they converted the car to bio-ethanol, qualifying ahead of 6 other cars. For 2007 he and David Pinkney teamed up to drive Alfa Romeo cars for Gary Ayles in the series. He scored no points, and missed the final two rounds following the multiple collision at Brands Hatch. He is no longer racing in the series.

Racing record

Complete British Touring Car Championship results
(key) (Races in bold indicate pole position – 1 point awarded in first race, 2003 in class) (Races in italics indicate fastest lap – 1 point awarded all races, 2003 in class) (* signifies that driver lead race for at least one lap – 1 point awarded all races)

References

External links
 Profile from btcc.net
 richardmarsh.com

British Touring Car Championship drivers
British GT Championship drivers
Living people
Porsche Carrera Cup GB drivers
Year of birth missing (living people)